Senator Baird may refer to:

Members of the United States Senate
David Baird Jr. (1881–1955), U.S. Senator from New Jersey
David Baird Sr. (1839–1927), U.S. Senator from New Jersey

United States state senate members
Delpha Baird (born 1930), Utah State Senate
John Baird (Michigan politician) (1859–1934), Michigan State Senate
LaRoy Baird (1881–1950), North Dakota State Senate
Samuel T. Baird (1861–1899), Louisiana State Senate